The municipality of Bella Unión is one of the municipalities of Artigas Department, Uruguay, established on 13 September 2009. Its seat is the city of Bella Unión. It replaced the Autonomous and Elective Local Board of Bella Union created in 1994.

History 
The Local Board of Bella Unión was established as Autonomous and Elective on 14 June 1994, obtaining wider powers than existing standard Local Boards. Until before the Laws of Municipalities were passed in late 2009 and early 2010, it was one of the three existing second level administrative subdivisions with certain level of autonomy and able to held local elections of its authorities. It comprised the territory of the Seventh Judicial Section of Artigas Department.

In September 2009 it was converted to Municipality, following the provisions of the Municipalities Laws 18567 and 18653 (that ordered the creation of municipalities in all settlements with a population of at least 2000 inhabitants), with the powers of the new system but also keeping the powers obtained from the former system. It includes the constituencies identified by the series ICD, ICE and ICF, and keeps the same territory assigned to the Autonomous and Elective Local Board of Bella Unión.

Location 
The municipality is located in the northeast corner of Artigas Department, west to the municipality of Tomás Gomensoro, and bordering Brazil's Rio Grande do Sul State to the north and Argentina's Corrientes Province to the west.

Settlements 
The following settlements are part of this region:
 Bella Unión (seat)
 Cainsa
 Calnu
 Cuareim
 Mones Quintela

Authorities 
The authority of the municipality is the Municipal Council, integrated by the Mayor (who presides it) and four Councilors. The following is the list of authorities since 2010.

Notes

References 

Bella Unión